is a railway station in the city of Shiroishi, Miyagi Prefecture, Japan, operated by East Japan Railway Company (JR East). This station is the central station in Shiroishi city, and the nearest station to Shiroishi Castle in the city center.

Lines

Station layout
The station has one side platform and one island platform connected to the station building by a footbridge. The station has a Midori no Madoguchi staffed ticket office.

Platforms

Transportation characteristics at this station
This station is the base station for operation in the southern part of Miyagi prefecture, and about half of the regular trains passing through this station (for Sendai) are the first train departing from this station.
Upbound (for Fujita , Date , Fukushima & Kōriyama)
One regular train (bound for Fukushima, some bound for Koriyama) stops approximately every 1–2 hours. Some trains are departing from Sendai-transfer to this station-bound for Fukushima. During certain hours, Rapid "Sendai City Rabbit" (for Fukushima) also stops.
Downbound (for Ogawara, Tsukinoki, Iwanuma, Natori & Sendai)
In general, two regular trains (for Sendai) stop every hour, and about half of the trains depart from the station. During some hours, the rapid “Sendai City Rabbit” (for Sendai) also stops.

History
Shiroishi Station opened on December 15, 1887. On October 25, 1970 a Sister station relationship with JR Shiroishi Station in Hokkaidō was established. The station was absorbed into the JR East network upon the privatization of the Japanese National Railways (JNR) on April 1, 1987.

Passenger statistics
In fiscal 2018, the station was used by an average of 2,892 passengers daily (boarding passengers only). Data for previous years is as follows:

Surrounding area

 Shiroishi City Hall
 Shiroishi Post Office

See also
 List of Railway Stations in Japan

References

External links

  

Railway stations in Miyagi Prefecture
Tōhoku Main Line
Railway stations in Japan opened in 1887
Shiroishi, Miyagi